KNEU is a station of the Kryvyi Rih tramway network, and also Kryvyi Rih Metro. The station was originally part of the city's larger tram system, although it was incorporated into the metrotram route along with four other stations on 25 May 2012. It is a station on the metrotram's third route, running from Zarichna to Kiltse KMK.

The tram line reorganization was initiated in order to eliminate the need for transfer stops for the inhabitants traveling from Kryvyi Rih's northern neighborhoods to the southern end of town, near the ArcelorMittal Kryvyi Rih plant.

The KNEU station is located above ground, with platforms running on either side of the metrotram's tracks. Passengers traveling on this station can transfer to the Kiltseva station. The station is named after the Kryvyi Rih National University (KNEU), which has an affiliate (the Kryvyi Rih College of Economics and Management) located in the city.

References

External links
 
 

Kryvyi Rih Metrotram stations
Railway stations opened in 2012